Great Plains Lutheran High School (also known as GPLHS) is a coeducational High School in Watertown, South Dakota, United States. It is the only private high school in Watertown, South Dakota. GPLHS is owned and operated by 48 congregations belonging to the Wisconsin Evangelical Lutheran Synod (WELS).

References

External links
 Official website
 SDHSAA school info

Private high schools in South Dakota
Schools in Codington County, South Dakota
Lutheran schools in South Dakota
1996 establishments in South Dakota
Educational institutions established in 1996
Buildings and structures in Watertown, South Dakota
Secondary schools affiliated with the Wisconsin Evangelical Lutheran Synod